Ichnomylax is an extinct genus of lungfish which lived during the Devonian period. Fossils have been found in Australia and Russia.

References

 
 

Prehistoric lungfish genera
Devonian bony fish
Fossils of Russia
Prehistoric fish of Australia